The 2004–05 Ukrainian Premier League Reserves season was an inaugural season of competition between reserve teams of Ukrainian Higher League clubs. The competition among reserve teams became the first official competition since fall of the Soviet Union and similar Soviet competitions in which Ukrainian clubs participated previously. The idea to revive such competitions was lingering for last couple of years (see, main article Ukrainian Premier League Reserves).

Final standings

Top scorers

See also
2004–05 Ukrainian Premier League

References

External links
Молодежное первенство. Результаты, турнирная таблица 
League Table at Metalurh Zaporizhya Official Website 
Молодіжна першість Dynamo Kyiv site
СЕЗОН 2008/2009. Молодіжна першість Karpaty Lviv site 
Ukrainian Premier League Reserves - Ukrainiansoccer.net 

Reser
Ukrainian Premier Reserve League seasons